Nunavut is the largest and northernmost territory of Canada. It was separated officially from the Northwest Territories on April 1, 1999, via the Nunavut Act and the Nunavut Land Claims Agreement Act, which provided this territory to the Inuit for independent government. The boundaries had been drawn in 1993. The creation of Nunavut resulted in the first major change to Canada's political map in half a century since the province of Newfoundland was admitted in 1949.

Nunavut comprises a major portion of Northern Canada and most of the Arctic Archipelago. Its vast territory makes it the fifth-largest country subdivision in the world, as well as North America's second-largest (after Greenland). The capital Iqaluit (formerly Frobisher Bay), on Baffin Island in the east, was chosen by a capital plebiscite in 1995. Other major communities include the regional centres of Rankin Inlet and Cambridge Bay.

Nunavut also includes Ellesmere Island to the far north, as well as the eastern and southern portions of Victoria Island in the west, and all islands in Hudson, James and Ungava bays, including Akimiski Island far to the southeast of the rest of the territory. It is Canada's only geo-political region that is not connected to the rest of North America by highway.

Nunavut is the least populous of Canada's provinces and territories. One of the world's most remote, sparsely settled regions, Nunavut has a population of 39,589 (2021 figure, up from 35,944 in 2016), consisting mostly of Inuit. With a population density of 0.02 people per square kilometer, Nunavut is the least densely populated country sub-division in the world, being even less densely populated than Denmark's Constituent Country of Greenland. Nunavut is also home to the world's northernmost permanently inhabited place, Alert. Eureka, a weather station on Ellesmere Island, has the lowest average annual temperature of any Canadian weather station.

History

Early history

The region which is now mainland Nunavut was first populated approximately 4,500 years ago by the Pre-Dorset, a diverse Paleo-Eskimo culture that migrated eastward from the Bering Strait region.

The Pre-Dorset culture was succeeded by the Dorset culture about 2,800 years ago. Anthropologists and historians believe that the Dorset culture developed from the Pre-Dorset somehow.

Helluland, which Norse explorers described visiting in their Sagas of Icelanders, has been associated with Nunavut's Baffin Island. Claims of contact between the Dorset and Norse are controversial.

The Thule people, ancestors of the modern Inuit, began migrating from Alaska in the 11th century into the Northwest Territories and Nunavut. By 1300, the geographic extent of Thule settlement included most of modern Nunavut.

The migration of the Thule people coincides with the decline of the Dorset, who died out between 800 and 1500.

European exploration

The earliest written historical account of the area is dated to 1576, an account by English explorer Martin Frobisher. While leading an expedition to find the Northwest Passage, Frobisher thought he had discovered gold ore around the body of water now known as Frobisher Bay on the coast of Baffin Island. The ore turned out to be worthless, but Frobisher made the first recorded European contact with the Inuit. Other explorers in search of the elusive Northwest Passage followed in the 17th century, including Henry Hudson, William Baffin and Robert Bylot.

20th and 21st centuries
Cornwallis and Ellesmere Islands featured in the history of the Cold War in the 1950s. Concerned about the area's strategic geopolitical position, the federal government, as part of the High Arctic relocation, relocated Inuit from Nunavik (northern Quebec) to Resolute and Grise Fiord. In the unfamiliar and hostile conditions, they faced starvation but were forced to stay.

Forty years later, the Royal Commission on Aboriginal Peoples issued a report titled The High Arctic Relocation: A Report on the 1953–55 Relocation. The government paid compensation to those affected and their descendants. On August 18, 2010, in Inukjuak, the Honourable John Duncan, PC, MP, previous Minister of Indian Affairs and Northern Development and Federal Interlocutor for Métis and Non-Status Indians formally apologized on behalf of the Government of Canada for the relocation of Inuit to the High Arctic.

Discussions on dividing the Northwest Territories along ethnic lines began in the 1950s, and legislation to achieve this was introduced in 1963. After its failure, a federal commission recommended against such a measure.

During the 1970s, activism increased among the Inuit, First Nations, and Innu peoples for recognition of their forced assimilation. In 1976, as part of the land claims negotiations between the Inuit Tapiriit Kanatami (then called the "Inuit Tapirisat of Canada") and the federal government, the parties discussed division of the Northwest Territories to provide a separate territory for the Inuit. On April 14, 1982, a plebiscite on division was held throughout the Northwest Territories. A majority of the residents voted in favour and the federal government gave a conditional agreement seven months later.

The land claims agreement was completed in September 1992 and ratified by nearly 85% of the voters in Nunavut in a referendum. On July 9, 1993, the  Nunavut Land Claims Agreement Act and the Nunavut Act were passed by the Canadian Parliament. The transition to establish Nunavut Territory was completed on April 1, 1999. The creation of Nunavut has been followed by considerable population growth in the capital Iqaluit, from 5,200 in 2001 to 6,600 in 2011, a 27% increase.

In 2020, Nunavut imposed strict travel regulations in order to prevent an outbreak of the COVID-19 pandemic. The government barred entry to almost all non-residents. As of October 2020, it was the only place in North America to have had no cases of COVID-19. On November 6, 2020, Nunavut confirmed its first case in Sanikiluaq.

Geography

The territory includes part of the mainland, most of the Arctic Archipelago, and all of the islands in Hudson Bay, James Bay, and Ungava Bay, including the Belcher Islands, all of which were part of the Northwest Territories from which Nunavut was separated. This makes it the fifth-largest subnational entity (or administrative division) in the world. If Nunavut were a country, it would rank 15th in area.

Nunavut has long land borders with the Northwest Territories on the mainland and a few Arctic islands, and with Manitoba to the south of the Nunavut mainland; it also meets Saskatchewan to the southwest at a quadripoint, and has a short land border with Newfoundland and Labrador on Killiniq Island. The boundary with the Northwest Territories roughly approximates the tree line in Canada. Nunavut shares maritime borders with the provinces of Quebec, Ontario, Manitoba, and with constituent country Greenland, with which it also shares a land border on Hans Island.

Nunavut's highest point is Barbeau Peak on Ellesmere Island. The population density is 0.019 persons/km2 (0.05 persons/sq mi), one of the lowest in the world. By comparison, Greenland has approximately the same area and nearly twice the population.

Climate

Nunavut experiences a polar climate in most regions, owing to its high latitude and lower continental summertime influence than areas to the west. In more southerly continental areas, very cold subarctic climates can be found, due to July being slightly milder than the required .

Demography

As of the 2016 Canada Census, the population of Nunavut was 35,944, a 12.7% increase from 2011. In 2006, 24,640 people identified as Inuit (83.6% of the total population), 100 as First Nations (0.3%), 130 as Métis (0.4%) and 4,410 as non-aboriginal (15.0%).

The population growth rate of Nunavut has been well above the Canadian average for several decades, mostly due to birth rates significantly higher than the Canadian average—a trend that continues. Between 2011 and 2016, Nunavut had the highest population growth rate of any Canadian province or territory, at a rate of 12.7%. The second-highest was Alberta, with a growth rate of 11.6%.

Nunavut has the highest smoking rate in all of Canada, with more than half of its adult population smoking cigarettes. Both men and women smoke regularly. Some 90% of pregnant women are smokers, although studies have shown it has detrimental effects.

Language

Official languages are Inuit (Inuktitut and Inuinnaqtun) sometimes called Inuktut, English, and French.

In his 2000 commissioned report ( Language of Instruction Research Paper) to the Nunavut Department of Education, Ian Martin of York University said that a "long-term threat to Inuit languages from English is found everywhere, and current school language policies and practices on language are contributing to that threat" if Nunavut schools follow the Northwest Territories model. He provided a 20-year language plan to create a "fully functional bilingual society, in Inuktitut and English" by 2020.

The plan provided different models, including:
 "Qulliq Model", for most Nunavut communities, with Inuktitut to be the main language of instruction.
 "Inuinnaqtun Immersion Model", for language reclamation and immersion to revitalize Inuinnaqtun as a living language.
 "Mixed Population Model", mainly for Iqaluit (possibly for Rankin Inlet), where the population is 40% , or non-Inuit, and may have different requirements.

Of the 34,960 responses to the census question concerning "mother tongue" in the 2016 census, the most commonly reported languages in Nunavut were:

At the time of the census, only English and French were counted as official languages. Figures shown are for single-language responses and the percentage of total single-language responses.

In the 2016 census it was reported that 2,045 people (5.8%) living in Nunavut had no knowledge of either official language of Canada (English or French). The 2016 census also reported that of the 30,135 Inuit in Nunavut, 90.7% could speak either Inuktitut or Inuinnaqtun.

Religion
In 2021 census, Christianity constitutes 73.5% of Nunavut's population down from 86% in the 2011 Census. The percentage of population which is non-religious has grown from 13% in 2011 to 24.9% in 2021 Census. About 1.6% of the population reported another religious affiliation including Aboriginal spirituality, Hinduism, Islam, Buddhism etc.

Economy

The economy of Nunavut is driven by the Inuit and Territorial Government, mining, oil, gas, and mineral exploration, arts, crafts, hunting, fishing, whaling, tourism, transportation, housing development, military, research, and education. Currently, one college operates in Nunavut, the Nunavut Arctic College, as well as several Arctic research stations located within the territory. The new Canadian High Arctic Research Station CHARS is planning for Cambridge Bay and high north Alert Bay Station.

Iqaluit hosts the annual Nunavut Mining Symposium every April, a tradeshow that showcases the many economic activities ongoing in Nunavut.

Baffinland is the territory’s largest private sector employer with more than 2,600 workers and accounted for 23 per cent of Nunavut’s economic activity in 2019.

Mining
There are currently three major mines in operation in Nunavut. Agnico-Eagle Mines Ltd – Meadowbank Division. Meadowbank Gold Mine is an open pit gold mine with an estimated mine life 2010–2020 and employs 680 people.

The second mine in production is the Mary River Iron Ore mine operated by Baffinland Iron Mines. It is located close to Pond Inlet on North Baffin Island. They produce a high grade direct ship iron ore. 

The most recent mine to open is Doris North or the Hope Bay Mine operated near Hope Bay Aerodrome by TMAC Resource Ltd. This new high grade gold mine is the first in a series of potential mines in gold occurrences all along the Hope Bay greenstone belt.

Mining projects

Historic mines

 Lupin Mine 1982–2005, gold, current owner Elgin Mining Ltd located near the Northwest Territories boundary near Contwoyto Lake)
 Polaris Mine 1982–2002, lead and zinc (located on Little Cornwallis Island, not far from Resolute)
 Nanisivik Mine 1976–2002, lead and zinc, prior owner Breakwater Resources Ltd (near Arctic Bay) at Nanisivik
 Rankin Nickel Mine 1957–1962, nickel, copper and platinum group metals
 Jericho Diamond Mine 2006–2008, diamond (located 400 km, 250 mi, northeast of Yellowknife) 2012 produced diamonds from existing stockpile. No new mining; closed.
 Doris North Gold Mine Newmont Mining approx  underground drifting/mining, none milled or processed. Newmont closed the mine and sold it to TMAC Resources in 2013. TMAC has now reached commercial production in 2017.

Energy

Nunavut's people rely primarily on diesel fuel to run generators and heat homes, with fossil fuel shipments from southern Canada by plane or boat because there are few to no roads or rail links to the region. There is a government effort to use more renewable energy sources, which is generally supported by the community.

This support comes from Nunavut feeling the effects of global warming. Former Nunavut Premier Eva Aariak said in 2011, "Climate change is very much upon us. It is affecting our hunters, the animals, the thinning of the ice is a big concern, as well as erosion from permafrost melting." The region is warming about twice as fast as the global average, according to the UN's Intergovernmental Panel on Climate Change.

Transportation
 Northern Transportation Company Limited, owned by Norterra, a holding company that was, until April 1, 2014, jointly owned by the Inuvialuit of the Northwest Territories and the Inuit of Nunavut.
 There are no sidewalks in Nunavut.

Tourism

In the second half of 2018 travellers visited Nunavut 134,000 times and spent $436 million. Two-thirds of those visits were by Nunavummiut (residents of Nunavut) travelling within the territory. The remaining came from outside other provinces or territories in Canada, or from abroad and spent $219 million. Travellers from Ontario make up the largest portion of visitors from outside the territory. The majority of visitors from outside of Nunavut are business travellers; in the second half of 2018 only 14% of visitors were in the territory for leisure. Tourism recreation in Nunavut include activities like dog sledding, snowmobiling, cultural festivals, hiking, arctic wildlife safaris and sea kayaking.

Culture

Media

The Inuit Broadcasting Corporation is based in Nunavut.  The Canadian Broadcasting Corporation (CBC) serves Nunavut through a radio and television production centre in Iqaluit, and a bureau in Rankin Inlet. Iqaluit is served by private commercial radio stations CKIQ-FM and CKGC-FM, both owned by Northern Lights Entertainment Inc. (CKIQ-FM had a rebroadcaster in Rankin Inlet that was discontinued in 2009.)

Periodicals
Nunavut is served by two regional weekly newspapers, Nunatsiaq News published by Nortext, and Nunavut News/North, published by Northern News Services, who also publish the multi-territory regional Kivalliq News.

Film
The film production company Isuma is based in Igloolik. Co-founded by Zacharias Kunuk and Norman Cohn in 1990, the company produced the 1999 feature Atanarjuat: The Fast Runner, winner of the Caméra d'Or for Best First Feature Film at the 2001 Cannes Film Festival. It was the first feature film written, directed, and acted entirely in Inuktitut.

In November 2006, the National Film Board of Canada (NFB) and the Inuit Broadcasting Corporation announced the start of the Nunavut Animation Lab, offering animation training to Nunavut artists at workshops in Iqaluit, Cape Dorset and Pangnirtung. Films from the Nunavut Animation Lab include Alethea Arnaquq-Baril's 2010 digital animation short Lumaajuuq, winner of the Best Aboriginal Award at the Golden Sheaf Awards and named Best Canadian Short Drama at the imagineNATIVE Film + Media Arts Festival.

In November 2011, the Government of Nunavut and the NFB jointly announced the launch of a DVD and online collection entitled Unikkausivut (Inuktitut: Sharing Our Stories), which will make over 100 NFB films by and about Inuit available in Inuktitut, Inuinnaqtun and other Inuit languages, as well as English and French. The Government of Nunavut is distributing Unikkausivut to every school in the territory.

Music

The music of Nunavut includes Inuit throat singing and drum-led dancing, along with country music, bluegrass, fiddling, square dancing and the button accordion from Austria.

Performing arts
Artcirq is a collective of Inuit circus performers based in Igloolik. The group has performed around the world, including at the 2010 Olympic Winter Games in Vancouver, British Columbia.

Sport
Nunavut competes at the Arctic Winter Games. Iqaluit co-hosted the 2002 edition in partnership with Nuuk, Greenland.

Hockey Nunavut was founded in 1999 and competes in the Maritime-Hockey North Junior C Championship.

Government and politics

The Commissioner of Nunavut is appointed by the Governor-in-Council consisting of the Governor General of Canada and the King's Privy Council for Canada. As in the other territories, the commissioner's role is symbolic and is analogous to that of a lieutenant-governor. While the commissioner is not formally a representative of the Canadian monarch, a role roughly analogous to representing the Crown has accrued to the position.

Nunavut elects a single member of the House of Commons of Canada. This makes Nunavut the second largest electoral district in the world by area after Greenland. The current MP is Lori Idlout of the New Democratic Party.

The members of the unicameral Legislative Assembly of Nunavut are elected individually; there are no parties and the legislature is consensus-based. The head of government, the premier of Nunavut, is elected by and from the members of the legislative assembly. On June 14, 2018, Joe Savikataaq was elected as the premier, after his predecessor Paul Quassa lost a non-confidence motion. Former Premier Paul Okalik set up an advisory council of eleven elders, whose function it is to help incorporate "Inuit Qaujimajatuqangit" (Inuit culture and traditional knowledge, often referred to in English as "IQ") into the territory's political and governmental decisions.

Due to the territory's small population, and the fact that there are only a few hundred voters in each electoral district, the possibility of two election candidates finishing in an exact tie is significantly higher than in any Canadian province. This has actually happened twice in the five elections to date, with exact ties in Akulliq in the 2008 Nunavut general election and in Rankin Inlet South in the 2013 Nunavut general election. In such an event, Nunavut's practice is to schedule a follow-up by-election rather than choosing the winning candidate by an arbitrary method. The territory has also had numerous instances where MLAs were directly acclaimed to office as the only person to register their candidacy by the deadline, as well as one instance where a follow-up by-election had to be held due to no candidates registering for the regular election in their district at all.

Owing to Nunavut's vast size, the stated goal of the territorial government has been to decentralize governance beyond the region's capital. Three regions—Kitikmeot, Kivalliq and Qikiqtaaluk/Baffin—are the basis for more localized administration, although they lack autonomous governments of their own.

The territory has an annual budget of C$700 million, provided almost entirely by the federal government. Former Prime Minister Paul Martin designated support for Northern Canada as one of his priorities in 2004, with an extra $500 million to be divided among the three territories.

In 2001, the government of New Brunswick collaborated with the federal government and the technology firm SSI Micro to launch Qiniq, a unique network that uses satellite delivery to provide broadband Internet access to 24 communities in Nunavut. As a result, the territory was named one of the world's "Smart 25 Communities" in 2006 by the Intelligent Community Forum, a worldwide organization that honours innovation in broadband technologies. The Nunavut Public Library Services, the public library system serving the territory, also provides various information services to the territory.

In September 2012, Premier Aariak welcomed Prince Edward and Sophie, Countess of Wessex, to Nunavut as part of the events marking the Diamond Jubilee of Queen Elizabeth II, Queen of Canada.

Administrative regions

Nunavut is divided into three administrative regions, the Kitikmeot Region, the Kivalliq Region, and the Qikiqtaaluk Region

Licence plates
The first design for Nunavut's licence plate was originally created for the Northwest Territories in the 1970s. The plate has long been famous worldwide for its unique design in the shape of a polar bear.

Nunavut was licensed by the NWT to use the same licence plate design in 1999 when it became a separate territory, but adopted its own plate design in March 2012 for launch in August 2012—a rectangle that prominently features the northern lights, a polar bear and an inuksuk.

Symbols

The flag and the coat of arms of Nunavut were designed by Andrew Qappik from Pangnirtung.

Territorial dispute

A long-simmering dispute between Canada and the U.S. involves the issue of Canadian sovereignty over the Northwest Passage.

Alcohol
Due to prohibition laws influenced by local and traditional beliefs, Nunavut has a highly regulated alcohol market. The territory is the last outpost of prohibition in Canada, and it is often easier to obtain firearms than alcohol. Although every community in Nunavut has slightly differing regulations, as a whole it is still very restrictive. Seven communities have complete bans against alcohol and another 14 have orders being restricted by local committees. Due to these laws, a lucrative bootlegging market has appeared in which people mark up the prices of bottles by extraordinary amounts. The RCMP estimate Nunavut's bootleg liquor market rakes in some $10 million a year.

Despite the restrictions, alcohol's availability leads to widespread alcohol related crime. One estimation states some 95% of police calls are alcohol-related.  Alcohol is also believed to be a contributing factor to the territory's high rates of violence, suicide, and homicide. A special task force created in 2010 to study and address the territory's increasing alcohol-related problems recommended the government ease alcohol restrictions. With prohibition shown to be highly ineffective historically, some believe these laws contribute to the territory's widespread social ills. Others are skeptical about the effectiveness of liquor sale liberalization and want to ban it completely. In 2014, Nunavut's government moved toward more legalization. In 2017, the first liquor store in 38 years opened in Iqaluit.

Notable people

Susan Aglukark is an Inuk singer and songwriter. She has released six albums and has won several Juno Awards. She blends the Inuktitut and English languages with contemporary pop music arrangements to tell the stories of her people, the Inuit of the Arctic.

On May 3, 2008, the Kronos Quartet premiered a collaborative piece with Inuit throat singer Tanya Tagaq, entitled Nunavut, based on an Inuit folk story. Tagaq is also known internationally for her collaborations with Icelandic pop star Björk, and her 2018 novel Split Tooth which was longlisted for the Scotiabank Giller Prize.

Jordin John Kudluk Tootoo (Inuktitut syllabics: ᔪᐊᑕᓐ ᑐᑐ; born February 2, 1983, in Churchill, Manitoba, Canada) played in the National Hockey League (NHL) for from 2003 to 2017. Although born in Manitoba, Tootoo grew up in Rankin Inlet, where he was taught to skate and play hockey by his father, Barney.

Hunter Tootoo, Member of Parliament for the Territory of Nunavut, was elected to the Liberal government in 2015. He served as the Minister of Fisheries, Oceans, and the Canadian Coast Guard until his resignation from the post on May 31, 2016.

See also

 Archaeology in Nunavut
 List of communities in Nunavut
 Symbols of Nunavut
 Nunatsiavut
 Nunavik

Footnotes

References

Further reading

 Alia, Valerie (2007). Names and Nunavut Culture and Identity in Arctic Canada. New York: Berghahn Books. .
 Henderson, Ailsa (2007). Nunavut: Rethinking Political Culture. Vancouver: University of British Columbia Press. .
 
 Kulchyski, Peter Keith (2005). Like the Sound of a Drum: Aboriginal Cultural Politics in Denendeh and Nunavut. Winnipeg: University of Manitoba Press. .
 Sanna, Ellyn, and William Hunter (2008). Canada's Modern-Day Aboriginal Peoples Nunavut & Evolving Relationships. Markham, Ont: Scholastic Canada. .

External links

 
 
 Map showing regions of Nunavut (from Nunavut Government website)
 Legislative Assembly of Nunavut
 Nunavut Planning Commission
 Annual Nunavut Mining Symposium held in April each year
 Nunavut Tunngavik Inc.: Nunavut Land Claims website
 The Nunavut Act of 1993 at Canadian Legal Information Institute
 : Martin, Ian. Aajiiqatigiingniq Language of Instruction Research Paper. Nunavut: Dept. of Education, 2000.

Tourism
 Explore Nunavut: Travel information and community guides
 Nunavut Parks

Journalism
 CBC North Radio: hear Inuktitut and English radio from Nunavut
 Territorial newspaper reporting in Inuktitut and English, Nunatsiaq News
 Nunavut News from News/North

 
1999 establishments in Canada
Arctic Ocean
Inuit territories
States and territories established in 1999
Provinces and territories of Canada